Jan Kubista may refer to:

 Jan Kubista (born 1960), Czechoslovak middle-distance runner
 Jan Kubista (born 1990), Czech middle-distance runner